The 2011 NRL season was the 104th season of professional rugby league football club competition in Australia, and the fourteenth and last run by the National Rugby League's partnership committee of the Australian Rugby League and News Ltd. The NRL's main championship, called the 2011 Telstra Premiership due to sponsorship from Telstra, was contested by sixteen teams for the fifth consecutive year. Alongside was the fourth season of the Toyota Cup taking place.

The season's Premiership title was awarded to the Manly Warringah Sea Eagles who took out their 8th title, only three years after their previous title, defeating the New Zealand Warriors in the grand final.

Season summary

The 2011 competition draw was announced on Thursday, 7 October 2010, with the season's first match between NRL teams to be played on Friday, 11 March. The first round of the premiership season became the highest attended round in NRL history, with 201,212 fans attending.
However, the first NRL match of the year was the second annual NRL All Stars vs Indigenous All Stars game played at Skilled Park on the Gold Coast on 12 February. The annual ANZAC Test was also held at Skilled Park, on 6 May, with City vs Country Origin held on the same night at the Lavington Sports Ground in Albury. The Test match was to have been held at Christchurch in New Zealand, but was moved due to the destruction wrought on that city by the earthquake in February 2011. 
Byes began on 6 May, being the day of those representative matches, and continued throughout the 2011 State of Origin series, covering in total rounds 9 to 18. 
Themed rounds included the Heritage Round (round 5), Women in League Round (round 16), and Rivalry Round (round 19).

The regular 26 round season finished with the Melbourne Storm winning the J. J. Giltinan Shield for being the minor premiers. However the grand final match-up ended up between the second placed Manly Warringah Sea Eagles and the sixth placed New Zealand Warriors in which the Sea Eagles sought victory and claimed their 8th premiership title.

The coveted Dally M Medal award for player of the year in 2011 was awarded to Melbourne Storm fullback Billy Slater, who becomes the second Storm player to be given the award. (see 2011 Dally M Awards for full award listing)

Records set in 2011

Canberra Raiders equalled their longest losing streak with 8-matches (Round 2 - Round 9).
Brisbane Broncos round-26 match was the biggest ever regular home game crowd for the Broncos at Suncorp Stadium with 50,859.
South Sydney Rabbitohs winger Nathan Merritt equaled the club record for the most tries in a match with 5-tries against the Parramatta Eels in Round 22.
Manly Warringah Sea Eagles set the record for the most points scored in a half of finals football when they scored 42 unanswered points against the North Queensland Cowboys.
Sea Eagles halves Kieran Foran (21) and Daly Cherry-Evans (22) became the youngest halves pairing to win a grand final since Brett Kenny (20) and Peter Sterling (21) in 1981

Teams
The number of teams in the NRL remained unchanged for the fourth consecutive season, with sixteen participating in the regular season: ten from New South Wales, three from Queensland and one from each of Victoria, the Australian Capital Territory and New Zealand. Of the ten from New South Wales, eight are from Sydney's metropolitan area, with St. George-Illawarra being a Sydney and Wollongong joint venture. Just two foundation clubs from New South Wales Rugby League season 1908 played in the competition: the Sydney Roosters (formerly known as Eastern Suburbs) and the South Sydney Rabbitohs.

Regular season

Bold – Home game
X – Bye
* – Golden point game
Opponent for round listed above margin

Ladder

Finals series

To decide the grand finalists from the top eight finishing teams, the NRL adopts the McIntyre final eight system. The 2011 finals series sees the Manly Warringah Sea Eagles, Wests Tigers, St George Illawarra Dragons and the New Zealand Warriors all return from last year. The Melbourne Storm and Brisbane Broncos both return after last year's absence whilst the North Queensland Cowboys and the Newcastle Knights appear in this year's finals for the first time since 2007 and 2009, respectively.

† - Match decided in golden point extra time

Finals chart

Grand Final

Club and player records
The following statistics are correct as of the conclusion of Round 26.

Top 5-point scorers

Top 5 try scorers

Top 5 goal scorers

Most points in a match by an individual

Most tries in a match by an individual

Paul Gallen ran 3,670 metres with the ball in 2011, more than any other player in the competition.

Attendances
The regular season attendances for the 2011 season aggregated to a total of 3,123,055 (average 16,267), becoming the second highest attended NRL season (after 2010).

The highest twenty regular season match attendances:

2011 Transfers

Players

See also
2011 NRL season results
2011 NRL Under-20s season

References

External links
 NRL.com – Official site of the NRL, National Rugby League
 NRL final eight Calculator, footy.com.au